Girst is a village in the commune of Rosport, in eastern Luxembourg.  , the village had a population of 109.

See also
 List of villages in Luxembourg

Rosport
Villages in Luxembourg